Merab Katsitadze (born 25 February 1963) is a retired Georgian professional football player.

1963 births
Living people
Soviet footballers
Footballers from Georgia (country)
Expatriate footballers from Georgia (country)
Expatriate footballers in Israel
Georgia (country) international footballers
FC Guria Lanchkhuti players
Maccabi Yavne F.C. players
Association football defenders